The Best Director Award is an award presented annually at the Cannes Film Festival since 1946. It is given for the best achievement in directing and is chosen by the International Jury from the films in the Competition slate at the festival. 

At the 1st Cannes Film Festival held in 1946, René Clément was the first winner of this award for his work on The Battle of the Rails, and Park Chan-wook is the most recent winner in this category for his work on Decision to Leave at the 75th Cannes Film Festival in 2022.

History
The award was first presented in 1946. The prize was not awarded on 12 occasions (1947, 1953–54, 1960, 1962–64, 1971, 1973–74, 1977, and 1980). The festival was not held at all in 1948, 1950, and 2020. In 1968, no awards were given as the festival was called off mid-way due to the May 1968 events in France. Also, the jury vote was tied, and the prize was shared by two directors on seven occasions (1955, 1969, 1975, 1983, 2001–02, and 2016). Joel Coen of the Coen brothers has received the most awards in this category, with three. One directing team has shared the award: Jean-Pierre & Luc Dardenne for Young Ahmed (2019). Yuliya Solntseva was the first woman to have won the award, for 1961's Chronicle of Flaming Years.

This happened only twice: Joel Coen won both awards for Barton Fink in 1991; and Gus Van Sant won for Elephant in 2003.

Winners

Multiple winners

The following individuals received two or more Best Director awards:

See also
 Silver Bear for Best Director
 Silver Lion

References

External links

Cannes Film Festival at the Internet Movie Database
Top 25 Movies That Won Best Director At Cannes - Taste of Cinema

 
Award for Best Director
Awards for best director
Cannes, Best Director